R. W. Paul presented Britain's second film projector, and the first commercially produced 35mm projector, the Theatrograph, on 20 February 1896. It was first demonstrated at Finsbury Technical College. The use of Paul's Theatrograph in music halls up and down the country popularised early cinema in Britain. It was first revealed to the public at the Egyptian Hall in Piccadilly, London.

Carl Hertz sailed from England on 28 March 1896 aboard the Royal Mail Ship  and during the voyage exhibited Paul's Theatrograph to the passengers. He also exhibited films in South Africa and Australia. The screenings in South Africa were the first public screenings of moving pictures in that country. After Australia, Hertz took the Theatrograph to Ceylon (Sri Lanka), India, China, Japan, the Fiji Islands, and Hawaii.

George Melies purchased one of Paul's theatrographs in 1896.

The Theatrograph was also known as the Animatograph.

Notes

References

Audiovisual introductions in 1896
Film and video technology
History of film
British inventions
Projectors